The 2015–16 NIFL Premiership (known as the Danske Bank Premiership for sponsorship reasons) was the eighth season of Northern Ireland's highest national football league in this format since its inception in 2008, the 115th season of Irish league football overall, and the third season of the league operating as part of the Northern Ireland Football League. The season began on 8 August 2015, and concluded with the final round of fixtures on 23 April 2016. The play-offs took place in May 2016.

Crusaders were the defending champions, after securing last season's title for the fifth time in the club's history on 18 April 2015 – their first title since the 1996–97 season. They successfully defended their title, winning the top flight title for the sixth time.

Changes from 2014–15
As a result of the association climbing to 44th-place in the 2015 UEFA country coefficients (which takes into account their performance in European competitions from 2010–11 to 2014–15) this season's Premiership champions will enter the 2016–17 UEFA Champions League second qualifying round directly instead of the first qualifying round as in previous seasons.
Finishing in third place no longer results in automatic entry into the UEFA Europa League qualifying rounds. At the end of the regular 38-game season, the clubs finishing from third to seventh position will participate in a series of play-offs. The winner of these play-offs will qualify for the 2016–17 UEFA Europa League first qualifying round, along with the league runners-up and the 2015–16 Irish Cup winners.

Teams
After finishing bottom of the table on their return to the top flight in the 2014–15 season following a four–year absence, Institute suffered relegation back to Championship 1 after only one season. Carrick Rangers replaced them for this season's Premiership, after winning the 2014–15 Championship 1 title to secure a return to the top flight for the first time in the three years since they were relegated in the 2011–12 season.

Warrenpoint Town finished in 11th place – the Promotion/relegation play-off place – and faced Championship 1 runners-up Bangor over two legs for the last remaining place in this season's Premiership. Following a 2–2 draw on aggregate after extra time in the second leg, Warrenpoint Town eventually won 3–1 on penalties to avoid relegation and retain their Premiership status for this season.

Stadia and locations

*Capacity numbers are approximate estimates, as no official figures have been released since 2010.*Carrick Rangers played some 'home' games at Seaview as a result of ongoing issues with their own playing surface at Taylors Avenue.

Personnel and kits

Managerial changes

League table

Results

Matches 1–22
During matches 1–22 each team will play every other team twice (home and away).

Matches 23–33
During matches 23–33 each team will play every other team for the third time (either at home, or away).

Matches 34–38
During matches 34–38 each team will play every other team in their half of the table once. As this will be the fourth time that teams play each other this season, home sides will be chosen so that they will have played each other twice at home and twice away.

Section A

Section B

Play-offs

UEFA Europa League play-offs
A new method of Europa League qualification was introduced for this season. As a result of the Irish Cup winners (Glenavon) finishing third in the league, the four remaining teams from the top seven that have not already qualified for Europe (the teams in positions 4–7) competed in a series of play-offs for the final place in the Europa League. The play-offs were seeded, with the higher-placed qualifiers given home advantage when facing the lower-placed qualifiers in the semi-finals. The two semi-final winners then met in the final. If three teams qualify for the play-offs, the highest-placed qualifier will receive a bye into the final with home advantage.

Had the Irish Cup winners finished lower than seventh in the league, all five teams that finished in third to seventh would have qualified for the play-offs. This would have required an additional quarter-final match to be played by the two lowest-placed qualifiers in sixth and seventh, with the winner joining the other three clubs in the semi-finals.

Dungannon Swifts finished in seventh place, but they were ineligible for the Europa League play-offs, as they did not apply for a UEFA licence. Therefore, only one semi-final match was played and fourth-placed Cliftonville were given a bye to the final.

Semi-final

Final

NIFL Premiership play-off
Eleventh-placed Ballinamallard United will play Institute, the play-off qualifier from the 2015–16 NIFL Championship 1 over two legs for a place in the 2016–17 NIFL Premiership. The Premiership club will play the first leg away from home, with home advantage for the second leg.

The matches were originally set to be played on 6 May and 10 May 2016.

On 9 May 2016, the IFA postponed the second leg until the conclusion of an investigation into allegations that Gary Haveron, the manager of Carrick Rangers may have failed to correctly serve a touchline ban. It is alleged that he was in the dugout at their 23 April match against Dungannon Swifts, which they won 3–1, instead sitting out another game when he was not actually banned.
The possible ramifications of these allegations were that if it was found that Haveron did not properly serve the ban, the penalty would have been a minimum fine of £350 and Carrick Rangers would forfeit the game as a 0–3 loss. This three-point deduction would have moved Carrick to the bottom of the table and automatic relegation, Ballinamallard would have risen to 10th and safety and Warrenpoint town would have risen to 11th and would then face Institute in the Play-off.
Carrick Rangers were formally charged with a formal breach of Article 23.1 of the IFA Disciplinary code and on 14 May Carrick Rangers announced that they will contest the charge and will make a further statement following receipt of legal advice. 
 On 18 May, however, no sanctions were imposed on the club after a disciplinary hearing and the second leg of the Play-off was rescheduled for 22 June.

Ballinamallard United won 5–4 on aggregate.

Season statistics

Top goalscorers

References

2015-16
North
1